Žeravice may refer to places:

Žeravice, Han Pijesak, Bosnia and Herzegovina
Žeravice, Olovo, Bosnia and Herzegovina
Žeravice (Hodonín District), Czech Republic

See also
Žeravica

Slavic toponyms